Banphikot is a rural municipality located in Western Rukum District of Karnali Province of Nepal.
According to 2011 Census conducted by Central Bureau of Statistics (CBS), Banphikot Rural Municipality had total population of 18,696. Banphikot Rural Municipality was established in 2015 through the merging five the former Village development committees of Aathbiskot, Pipal, Duli (ward no. 4, 5 &6) and Magma (ward no. 1-6 & 9).  This Municipality shares boarder with Sisne Rural Municipality (East Rukum district) in the East, Sani Bheri Rural Municipality in the West, Aathbiskot Municipality in the North, and Musikot Municipality in the South.

Demographics
At the time of the 2011 Nepal census, 99.8% of the population in Banphikot Rural Municipality spoke Nepali as their first language; 0.2% spoke other languages.

In terms of ethnicity/caste, 55.5% were Chhetri, 12.0% Kami, 9.7% Magar, 8.9% Thakuri, 7.2% Hill Brahmin, 4.2% Damai/Dholi, 1.4% Sarki, 0.4% Sanyasi/Dasnami, 0.2% Gaine and 0.5% others.

In terms of religion, 99.1% were Hindu, 0.4% Christian, 0.2% Buddhist and 0.3% others.

References

External links
 Official website

Populated places in Western Rukum District
Rural municipalities in Karnali Province
Rural municipalities of Nepal established in 2017